2011 Copa Rio also known as  Copa Rio de Profissionais 2011, was the 14th edition of Copa Rio. 17 teams participated in the tournament.

The winner chose between 2012 Campeonato Brasileiro Série D and 2012 Copa do Brasil qualification. The runner-up qualified for the other tournament.

Format
The clubs were divided into four groups of five. The best two teams in each group and the two best 3rd-placed teams advanced to the second stage.
In the second stage the clubs were divided into two groups of four. The best two teams in each group advance to the knockout stage.

Participating teams

First stage

Group A

Group B

Group C

Group D

Ranking of 3rd placed teams
For the determination of the best two 3rd placed teams the  índice técnico (Pts+GD)/Pld is used.

Second stage

Final stage

References

External links

Copa
Copa Rio (state cup) seasons